Ground Breaking Ceremony is Himsa's first album. It was released on 2 November 1999 through Revelation Records (Rev# 87). This was the only full-length album not to feature John Pettibone as vocalist.

Track listing 
"Daylight Savings" - 1:20
"The Great Depression" - 2:40
"Another Version of the Twist" - 3:38
"Ground Breaking Ceremony" - 5:11
"Carrier" - 3:26
"Mud" - 3:08
"Cremation" - 4:42
"The Date Is Here" - 5:05
"Tapas" - 3:58
"White Out" - 5:21

Himsa albums
1999 debut albums